Kool Keith Presents Tashan Dorrsett is the tenth solo studio album by American rapper and producer Kool Keith, and his debut release under his 'Tashan Dorrsett' alias. It was dropped on February 24, 2009 via Junkadelic Music, making it the rapper's first release on the label. The album featured guest appearances from Ced-Gee, Marc Live, Champ, D.Eazy, and Dgiz. The concept of the album was, in Keith's words, a reality show in which the street-smart, down-to-earth Tashan was the star. The album was produced by Junkaz Lou, who previously worked with Keith on the Official Space Tape and Collabs Tape. 

A remix album titled The Legend of Tashan Dorrsett was released on May 3, 2011. Tashan Dorrsett returned with The Preacher on July 29, 2016.

Track listing

Personnel

Big D - additional vocals (track 14)
Cedric Ulmont Miller - featured artist (tracks 7, 18)
Champ - featured artist (track 13)
D.Eazy - featured artist (tracks 7, 18)
Darlee - additional vocals (track 10)
DJ Netik - scratches (track 2)
El Noor - additional vocals (track 14)
Fabrice "Lotion Man" Ho-Shui Ling - recording (track 10), mixing (tracks 1-19)
Hustlers Corner - production (track 7)
Joe Hernandez - recording (tracks 1-9, 11-18)
Karim "Dgiz" Ghizellaoui - featured artist (track 15)
"Kool" Keith Matthew Thornton - executive production, lyrics, main performer
"Kut Masta" Kurt Matlin - recording and mixing (track 21)
Larry Hutch - mixing (tracks 1-19)
Louis "DJ Junkaz Lou" Gomis - arranging, production (tracks 1-6, 8-21), scratches (tracks 1, 3-21), executive production 
Mark A. "Mr. Sche" Dokes - mastering, recording and mixing (track 20)
Marc "Marc Live" Giveand - featured artist (track 15)
Nator - project coordinator, photographer, executive production 
Pat - guitar (track 8)
Shoet - artwork

References

External links 

2009 albums
Kool Keith albums